General transcription factor IIF subunit 1 is a protein that in humans is encoded by the GTF2F1 gene.

Interactions 

GTF2F1 has been shown to interact with:

 CTDP1, 
 GTF2H4, 
 HNRPU, 
 MED21, 
 POLR2A, 
 Serum response factor 
 TAF11, 
 TAF1, 
 TATA binding protein,  and
 Transcription Factor II B.

See also 
 Transcription factor II F

References

Further reading

External links 
 
 

Transcription factors